HMS Java was a British Royal Navy 38-gun fifth-rate frigate. She was originally laid down in 1805 as Renommée, described as a 40-gun  French Navy frigate, but the vessel actually carried 46 guns. The British captured her in 1811 in a noteworthy action during the Battle of Tamatave, but she is most famous for her defeat on 29 December 1812 in a three-hour single-ship action against . Java had a complement of about 277, but during her engagement with Constitution she allegedly had 426 aboard, in comparison with her opponent's 475.

French service

In May 1811, she was part of a three-sail squadron under François Roquebert, comprising Renommée,  and Néréide, and ferrying troops to Mauritius. In the ensuing Battle of Tamatave, Renommée struck after her mainsail was set on fire. The British captured Néréide five days later at Tamatave, Madagascar. Clorinde, commanded by Jacques de Saint-Cricq, escaped.

Royal Navy service
In July Java was under Captain William Gordon, but not commissioned until August under Captain Henry Lambert, a senior commander who had seen combat on a number of occasions in His Majesty's service.

Java sailed from Portsmouth on 12 November for Bombay to deliver the appointed governor, Lieutenant-General Sir Thomas Hislop, and his staff with their baggage, and naval stores (including copper plates for the under-construction , at Bombay, and plans for the new ship). She was carrying additional personnel for other ships at the time and included another Royal Navy commander in transit.

Capture by USS Constitution

Captain Lambert of Java was a well-qualified officer, having seen much combat during his service. Java had more than a full crew, having been rounded out while in Portsmouth, but many were landsmen still raw to service at sea, and even more damning to her cause, they had only practised gunnery once without shot loaded in the guns. Still, Java was well supplied and manned, and would prove to be well handled and well fought.  had an experienced crew manning a heavy frigate carrying 54 cannon: thirty 24-pounder guns and twenty-four 32-pounder carronades, plus two 24-pounder bow chasers.

On 26 December Hornet was sent into the port to communicate with the American consul stationed there. On 29 December at 9:00 a.m., still out at high sea in search of prizes, crewmen aloft Constitution sighted strange sails on the distant horizon. Bainbridge initially was unsure of the disposition of the ships, but hours later as they drew closer he was able to discern that the approaching vessels were large and now assumed them to be British. To ascertain the disposition of the unidentified ships Constitution hoisted private signals (flags) at 11:30 a.m., while the assumed British vessel also hoisted its signals, but neither ship made the correct counter-signal.

Constitution, tacking the wind, made her way from the neutral Portuguese territorial waters with Java giving chase. At 12:30 p.m. that day  Java hoisted her colors and ensign with Constitution hoisting her colors in reply. With the dispositions of each ship confirmed, Java, with the weather gauge to her advantage, came about to position herself to rake Constitution. Being French-built, she was comparatively light for a frigate and was consequently faster and more maneuverable than Constitution. In reply Constitution fired a shot across Javas bow with Java returning fire with a full broadside.

Java started the battle badly out-matched both in terms of the experience of her crew and the weight of her broadside. Constitution, with her experienced commander and crew, countered by not shortening sail as was standard (this reduced strain on the masts, thus making it less likely to lose a mast under fire). By 2:00 p.m., both ships were heading southeast. The opening phase of the action comprised both ships turning to and fro, attempting to get the better position for which to fire upon and rake the other, but with little success. Bainbridge now wore Constitution to a matching course and opened fire with a broadside at half a mile. This broadside accomplished nothing and forced Bainbridge to risk raking to close Java. Another broadside from Java carried away Constitutions helm, disabling her rudder and leaving Bainbridge severely wounded; however he still maintained command, refusing to sit out the battle. Both ships resumed firing broadsides but by now Java had a mast and sail falling over her starboard side that prevented most of her guns on that side from firing, which also prevented her from laying alongside Constitution. The guns that attempted to fire only managed to set the fallen sail and rigging ablaze.

Constitutions accuracy of fire and the greater weight of her broadside put the much smaller Java at a large disadvantage. Within one hour, after several close encounters involving the rigging of each ship getting entangled with the other's, Javas masts collapsed. During this encounter a sharpshooter aloft in Constitution mortally wounded Lambert. Lieutenant Henry Ducie Chads now took over command, assisted by the captain in transit to his ship. Bainbridge used this opportunity to distance Constitution so as to make immediately-needed repairs, taking approximately an hour. Clearing the masts and fallen rigging aboard Java had hardly begun when Constitution returned from repairing her damage and immediately took a raking position from which Java could not defend herself. This left Lieutenant Chads no choice but to surrender Java. Constitution hoisted out a boat and sent First Lieutenant Parker to take possession of the prize. 

In the battle, Java suffered 22 men killed, including Lambert, and 102 wounded. Constitution lost nine men initially and 57 wounded, including Bainbridge. Some four or five later succumbed to their wounds.

In the course of battle Java was rendered a dismasted hulk that was not worth taking as a prize. Instead Bainbridge removed her helm and installed it on Constitution, replacing the one that had been shot away. On New Year's Day 1813, two days after the engagement, Bainbridge gave the order to set Java ablaze; she subsequently blew up.

Upon learning of the death of Captain Lambert, Commodore Bainbridge expressed deep sorrow for a commander he credited to be brave and noble. On 23 April 1813, Lieutenant Chads and the other surviving officers and men of Java faced the customary court martial aboard  for the loss of their ship. They were honourably acquitted.

In fiction
The engagement between Java and Constitution was fictionalized in the novel The Fortune of War by Patrick O'Brian. and in the novel "Yankee Mission" by Julian Stockwin.

See also

Bibliography of early United States naval history
Glossary of nautical terms (A-L)
Glossary of nautical terms (M-Z)
List of early warships of the English navy
List of ship names of the Royal Navy
List of ships captured in the 19th century
Sailing ship tactics

Notes

Citations

References
 
 
 
 
 
 
 

 

Frigates of the Royal Navy
Pallas-class frigates (1808)
Ships built in France
War of 1812 ships of the United Kingdom
Naval battles of the War of 1812
1808 ships
Captured ships
Maritime incidents in 1812
Maritime incidents in 1813